Jaciążek  is a village in the administrative district of Gmina Płoniawy-Bramura, within Maków County, Masovian Voivodeship, in east-central Poland.

As of 2011, the village has a population of 305.

References

Villages in Maków County